Helechosa de los Montes is a municipality in the province of Badajoz, Extremadura, Spain. According to the 2021 census (INE), It has a population of 612 inhabitants and an area of 309 km².

References

Municipalities in the Province of Badajoz